Ichiro Fujimori from the Broadcom Corporation, in Irvine, California was named a Fellow of the Institute of Electrical and Electronics Engineers (IEEE) in 2014 for contributions to oversampled data converters and gigabit wireline transceivers.

Education and career
Fujimori received the B.S. degree in electrical engineering from the Science University of Tokyo, Japan, in 1985, and the Ph.D. degree from the University of Hiroshima, Japan, in 2003. In 1985, he joined Asahi-Kasei Microsystems, Japan, and was engaged in the design and development of high-resolution Delta-Sigma data converters for digital-audio and xDSL applications.

In 2000, he joined Newport Communications (later acquired by Broadcom). As the Manager of
Mixed-Signal Engineering, he led the team to the development of the first CMOS transceiver LSIs for SONET OC-192 applications. He is currently the Senior Director of Engineering at the Analog and RF Microelectronics Group, Broadcom Corporation, Irvine, CA. He is responsible for the development of multi gigabit-rate SerDes for networking, transceivers for optical communications, Ethernet copper PHYs, PLLs, and power management circuits, all in CMOS.

Dr. Fujimori was the recipient of the IEEE Journal of Solid-State Circuits Best Paper Award in 2000 for his paper entitled "A Multi-bit Delta-Sigma Audio DAC with 120-dB Dynamic Range." He currently serves on the Technical Program Committee of the IEEE International Solid-State Circuits Conference (ISSCC) and the VLSI Circuits Symposium.

References

External links

20th-century births
Living people
Japanese electrical engineers
University of Tokyo alumni
Tokyo University of Science alumni
Fellow Members of the IEEE
Year of birth missing (living people)
Place of birth missing (living people)